The Dundonnell River is a river in Ross and Cromarty, in the Scottish Highlands.

The river rises in a lochan on the slopes of Meall Dubh, before flowing north into the Dundonnell Forest. The A832 road follows its course roughly NNW, before the river flows through Strath Beag and meets Little Loch Broom at its estuary just north-west of Dundonnell.

References

Rivers of Highland (council area)
Geography of Ross and Cromarty
Ross and Cromarty